Grace Nickel  is a Canadian ceramic artist and art instructor in post-secondary education.

Early life
Grace Nickel was born in 1956. She earned her BFA in Ceramics from the University of Manitoba in 1980; Museology Studies certificate, University of Winnipeg in 1981 and; MFA from the Nova Scotia College of Art and Design, Halifax, Nova Scotia in 2008. In the summer of 1999, she was invited to the 9th National Ceramic Conference in Perth, Australia. There she demonstrated her work in paper clay as well as presenting work of Manitoba's ceramic community.

Career
In 1991 she discovered paper clay while at the Banff Centre. Since that time she has employed that material to create sculptural ceramics. She has developed a number of architectural installations, including the Meditation Window at the St. Norbert Arts Centre in Manitoba, and Sanctuary, NCECA in Minneapolis, USA, 1995. Nickel completed a number of site-specific commissions, including tile installations and sculptural lighting for public and private architectural spaces. In 1999 she created a tile triptych to honour of the hosting of the Pan Am Games that was subsequently exhibited at Winnipeg City Hall. She created a work for the entrance to the Beechwood National Cemetery in Ottawa, Ontario.

Nickel teaches ceramics full-time in the School of Art of the University of Manitoba.

Exhibitions
Nickel's work has been exhibited in the United States and overseas in Australia, Japan, New Zealand and Taiwan, including,
Unity and Diversity Cheongju International Craft Biennale, Korea
Northern Lights/Southern Exposure, Perth Galleries, Perth, AustraliaInaugural Exhibition The Canadian Ceramic Museum, Fuping, China, 2007Earth Matters NCECA Invitational Exhibition 2010, Philadelphia
and in Canada, solo exhibitions at,A Quiet Passage, solo exhibition, Winnipeg Art Gallery, 2002
Mary E. Black Gallery, Halifax, Nova Scotia, 2008
Gallery in the Park, Altona, Manitoba 2009Arbor Vitae, solo exhibition at the Canadian Clay and Glass Gallery in Waterloo, ON, 2015, at Actual Contemporary, Winnipeg, MB, 2016, Disjecta Contemporary Art Centre, Portland, OR, 2017, and the Moose Jaw Museum and Art Gallery, 2018Eruptions, solo exhibition at the Art Gallery of Burlington, 2019

Selected collections
In Canada her work is included in the collections of:
 The Claridge Collection, Montreal (1989 to 2015)
 Winnipeg Art Gallery
 Government of Manitoba art collection
Art Gallery of Nova Scotia
In addition her work has been acquired by:
 National Museum of History, Taipei, Taiwan
 Museum of Modern Ceramic Art, Gifu, Japan
 Taipei County Yingge Ceramic Museum, Taiwan

AwardsBronze Award, 2nd International Ceramics Competition 1989, Mino, Japan.Judge's Special Award, Sixth Taiwan Golden Ceramics Awards, Taipei, Taiwan
Inducted into the Royal Canadian Academy of Arts in 2007

Bibliography
 Glen R. Brown (2012), "Grace Nickel, Clay and Light", pp 47–52 in Anderson Turner ed., Ceramic Art: Innovative Techniques (Ceramic Arts Handbook series), The American Ceramic Society, 136 pp, 9781574985290.
 Patricia Bovey (2007), "Grace Nickel", in Ingeborg Boyens ed., Encyclopedia of Manitoba'', pp 498–99. Winnipeg: Great Plains Publications, 9781894283717.
 Helen Delacretaz and Grace Nickel (2002), Grace Nickel: A Quiet Passage, Winnipeg: The Winnipeg Art Gallery, 32 pp, .

See also
List of Canadian artists

References

External links
Official web site

Canadian ceramists
Living people
University of Manitoba alumni
NSCAD University alumni
Academic staff of the University of Manitoba
Women potters
Canadian women ceramists
Artists from Manitoba
Members of the Royal Canadian Academy of Arts
1956 births